The Battle of Minden was a major engagement during the Seven Years' War, fought on 1 August 1759.  An Anglo-German army under the overall command of Prussian Field Marshal Ferdinand of Brunswick defeated a French army commanded by Marshal of France, Marquis de Contades. Two years previously, the French had launched a successful invasion of Hanover and attempted to impose an unpopular treaty of peace upon the allied nations of Britain, Hanover and Prussia. After a Prussian victory at Rossbach, and under pressure from Frederick the Great and William Pitt, King George II disavowed the treaty. In 1758, the allies launched a counter-offensive against the French and Saxon forces and drove them back across the Rhine.

After the allies failed to defeat the French before reinforcements swelled their retreating army, the French launched a fresh offensive, capturing the fortress of Minden on 10 July. Believing Ferdinand's forces to be over-extended, Contades abandoned his strong positions around the Weser and advanced to meet the Allied forces in battle. The decisive action of the battle came when six regiments of British and two of Hanoverian infantry, in line formation, repelled repeated French cavalry attacks; contrary to all fears that the regiments would be broken. The Allied line advanced in the wake of the failed cavalry attack, sending the French army reeling from the field, ending all French designs upon Hanover for the remainder of the year.

In Britain, the victory is celebrated as contributing to the Annus Mirabilis of 1759.

Background
The western German-speaking states of Europe had been a major theatre of the Seven Years' War since 1757, when the French had launched an invasion of Hanover. This culminated in a significant victory for the French at the Battle of Hastenbeck and the attempted imposition of the Convention of Klosterzeven upon the defeated allies: Hanover, Prussia and Britain. Prussia and Britain refused to ratify the convention and, in 1758, a counter-offensive commanded by Ferdinand saw French forces first driven back across the Rhine, and then beaten at the Battle of Krefeld. The Prussian port of Emden was also recaptured, securing supply from Britain. In fact, the British government, which had previously been opposed to any direct involvement on the continent, took the opportunity of the 1758–59 winter break in fighting to send nine thousand British troops to reinforce Ferdinand. The French crown also sent a reinforcing army, under Contades, hoping this would help to secure a decisive victory, swiftly concluding the costly war, and forcing the Allies to accept the peace terms France was seeking.

In an attempt to defeat the French before their reinforcements arrived, Ferdinand decided to launch a fresh counter-offensive, and quit his winter quarters early. In April, however, Victor-François, Duke de Broglie and the French withstood Ferdinand's attack at the Battle of Bergen, and de Broglie was promoted to Marshal of France. Ferdinand was forced to retreat northwards in the face of the now reinforced French army. Contades, senior of the two French marshals, resumed the advance, occupying a number of towns and cities including the strategic fortress at Minden, which fell to the French on 10 July. Ferdinand was criticised for his failure to check the French offensive. His celebrated brother-in-law, Frederick the Great, is reported as having suggested that, since his loss at Bergen, Ferdinand had come to believe the French to be invincible. Irrespective of any presumed crisis of confidence, however, Ferdinand did ultimately decide to confront the French, near Minden.

Contades had taken up a strong defensive position along the Weser around Minden, where he had paused to regroup before he continued his advance. He initially resisted the opportunity to abandon this strong position to attack Ferdinand. Ferdinand instead formulated a plan that involved splitting his force into several groups to threaten Contades' lines of supply. Perceiving Ferdinand's forces to be over-extended, Contades thought he saw a chance for the desired decisive victory. He ordered his men to abandon their defensive encampments and advance into positions on the plain west of Minden during the night of 31 July and early morning of 1 August.

Topography

In 1759, the fortified city of Minden, now the Innenstadt (inner city) of modern Minden, was situated at the confluence of the Weser, which flows from south to north, and the Bastau, a marshy tributary rivulette. The Bastau drains into the Weser from west to east, roughly parallel with, and south of, the western arm of modern Germany's Midland Canal, where it crosses the Weser at Minden, north of the Innenstadt via the second largest water bridge in Europe). The Battle of Minden took place on the plain immediately in front of the city and its fortifications, to its northwest, with the Weser and Bastau lying behind the city to its east and south respectively.

On the 31st, the French troops under Contades' direct command had their positions west of the Weser and south of the Bastau, crossing to the north over five pontoons during the night and early morning of the 1st. The French under the junior marshal, de Broglie, were stationed astride the Weser. Some were occupying Minden on the 31st, while the remainder, stationed east of the Weser, crossed over to join them during the night.

Battle
In an exception to the norm for the era, Contades placed his artillery in the centre protected only by the cavalry, with his infantry on each flank. The battle began on the French right flank, where Marshal de Broglie, who commanded the reserve, began an artillery duel against the allied left.

The decisive action of the battle took place in the centre, famously due to a misunderstanding of orders. Friedrich von Spörcken's division, composed of the infantry of the British contingent of the allied army (two brigades under Earl Waldegrave and William Kingsley) and supported by the Hanoverian Guards, actually advanced to attack the French cavalry. It is reported that they had been ordered "to advance [up-]on the beating of drums" (i.e., advance when the signal drums begin to beat,) misunderstanding this as "to advance to the beating of drums" (i.e., advance immediately while beating drums.) Since the French cavalry was still in its ranks and the famous 'hollow square' had not yet been developed, it was assumed by all that the six leading British regiments were doomed. Despite being under constant artillery fire, the six regiments (soon supported by two Hanoverian battalions), by maintaining fierce discipline and closed ranks, drove off repeated cavalry charges with musket fire and inflicted serious casualties on the French. Contades reportedly said bitterly, "I have seen what I never thought to be possible—a single line of infantry break through three lines of cavalry, ranked in order of battle, and tumble them to ruin!"

Supported by the well-served British and Hanoverian artillery, the entire allied line eventually advanced against the French army and sent it fleeing from the field. The only French troops capable of mounting any significant resistance were those of de Broglie, who formed a fighting rear guard.

The following is an account of the battle by Lt. Hugh Montgomery of the 12th Regiment of Foot, to his mother:

Aftermath
Prince Ferdinand's army suffered nearly 2,800 men killed and wounded; the French lost about 7,000 men. In the wake of the battle the French retreated southwards to Kassel. The defeat ended the French threat to Hanover for the remainder of that year.

Ferdinand's cavalry commander, Lieutenant General Lord George Sackville, was accused of ignoring repeated orders to bring up his troopers and charge the enemy until it was too late to make any difference. In order to clear his name he requested a court martial, but the evidence against him was substantial and the court martial declared him "...unfit to serve His Majesty in any military Capacity whatever." Sackville would later reappear as Lord George Germain and bear a major portion of the blame for the outcome of the American Revolution while Secretary of State for the Colonies.

In Britain the result at Minden was widely celebrated and was seen as part of Britain's Annus Mirabilis of 1759 also known as the "Year of Victories", although there was some criticism of Ferdinand for not following up his victory more aggressively. When George II of Great Britain learned of the victory, he awarded Ferdinand £20,000 and the Order of the Garter. Minden further boosted British support for the war on the continent, and the following year a "glorious reinforcement" was sent, swelling the size of the British contingent in Ferdinand's army.

In France the reaction to the result was severe. The Duc de Choiseul, the French Chief Minister, wrote "I blush when I speak of our army. I simply cannot get it into my head, much less into my heart, that a pack of Hanoverians could defeat the army of the King". To discover how the defeat had occurred and to establish the general condition of the army, Marshal d'Estrées was sent on a tour of inspection. Marshal de Contades was subsequently relieved of his command and replaced by the Duc de Broglie.

Michel Louis Christophe Roch Gilbert Paulette du Motier, Marquis de La Fayette and colonel aux Grenadiers de France, was killed when he was hit by a cannonball in this battle. La Fayette's son, Gilbert du Motier, marquis de Lafayette, was not even two years old at that time. Jean Thurel, the 59-year-old French fusilier, was severely wounded, receiving seven sword slashes, six of them to the head.

In regimental tradition

The British regiments which fought at Minden (with the successor British army unit which still uphold their traditions) were:
 Royal Artillery
 12th of Foot (Suffolk Regiment), now part of The Royal Anglian Regiment
 20th Foot (Lancashire Fusiliers), now part of the Royal Regiment of Fusiliers
 23rd Foot (Royal Welsh Fusiliers), now the 1st Battalion, The Royal Welsh (Royal Welsh Fusiliers)
 25th Foot (King's Own Scottish Borderers), now The Royal Scots Borderers (1st Battalion The Royal Regiment of Scotland)
 37th Foot (Royal Hampshire Regiment), now part of the Princess of Wales's Royal Regiment
 51st Foot (King's Own Yorkshire Light Infantry), now part of The Rifles

The descendants of these units are still known as "the Minden Regiments."

When the British infantry and artillery were first advancing to battle they passed through some German gardens and the soldiers picked roses and stuck them in their coats. In memory of this, each of the Minden regiments marks 1 August as Minden Day. On that day the men of all ranks wear roses in their caps. The Royal Regiment of Artillery wear red roses, The Royal Anglians, The Royal Regiment of Fusiliers and the Princess of Wales's Royal Regiment wear red and yellow roses; the Scots wear red; the Rifles wear Yorkshire white roses. From this tradition, and to mark the heroism of the Yorkshiremen who fought, 1 August has been adopted as Yorkshire Day. The Royal Welch Fusiliers do not wear roses on Minden Day as the Minden Rose was incorporated into the roundel of their cap badge and so is worn every day of the year, though retired members of the Regiment do sport roses in the lapels on Minden Day. Artillery regiments with Minden associations (see below) also wear red roses.

This British victory was also recalled in the British Army's Queen's Division which maintained the "Minden Band" until its 2006 amalgamation with the "Normandy Band" to form the Band of the Queen's Division.

Two batteries from the Royal Regiment of Artillery carry the Minden battle honour. Soldiers from both 12 (Minden) Battery and 32 (Minden) Battery traditionally wear a red rose in their headdress on 1 August every year, both batteries celebrate Minden Day every year. A proud tradition exists: 'Once a Minden Man, always a Minden Man.'.

Every year since 1967, six red roses have been anonymously delivered to the British consulate in Chicago on 1 August. Until they were closed, roses were also delivered to consulates in Kansas City, Minneapolis and St. Louis, starting as early as 1958 in Kansas City. A note that comes with the roses lists the six regiments and says, "They advanced through rose gardens to the battleground and decorated their tricorne hats and grenadier caps with the emblem of England. These regiments celebrate Minden Day still, and all wear roses in their caps on this anniversary in memory of their ancestors." The Embassy has asked for the name of the sender (on numerous occasions) so that they may thank the individual in person, but the identity of the donor remains a mystery.

In poetry
 Erasmus Darwin, Death of Eliza at the Battle of Minden
 Rudyard Kipling, "The Men That Fought at Minden" in Barrack-Room Ballads

In Freemasonry 
During the Cold War by 1972 some 50,000 British Forces were deployed to Germany. Minden at the time was well established as a Garrison with the Garrison HQ located within Kingsley Barracks, later also, in 1976 the home of HQ 11th Armoured Brigade. Since 1957, within BAOR (British Army of the Rhine), 11 British speaking Lodges had been founded under the Grand Land Lodge of British Freemasons in Germany. The closest Lodge at the time nearest to Minden was Britannia Lodge No. 843 of Bielefeld, some 50 Km distance and, at the time, a 1 hour drive. A meeting was held in the Royal Electrical & Mechanical Engineers (REME) Officers Mess, Johansen Str 1, Minden, on 24 June 1972, to determine whether it would be plausible to form a resident Lodge in Minden to fulfill  the needs of Freemasons among the military serving there. This was agreed and a petition was sent to the Grand Land Master for review. Once the proposed By laws had been approved by the Grand Secretary the petition was signed and permission to form the Lodge was given on 13 August 1972. The consecration ceremony took place on 28 October 1972, but was held in Herford due to insufficient space the intended Lodge rooms could provide in Minden.

The name chosen for the Lodge was The Rose of Minden Lodge No.918. The name, suggested by Brother B. Potter at the initial meeting, was agreed as being a proper and sincere tribute to the British Forces serving in Minden, from which, many of its new and intended members were stationed.

When the Cold War ended in 1991, Minden was closed as a garrison, meaning that Lodge membership dwindled as the troops moved away. To counteract this migration of members, it was decided to move the lodge to Herford which was to become the home of 1st UK Armoured Division. The Lodge resides, and still does to this, at the place where it was originally consecrated and shares the Lodge house  "Logenhaus Unter den Linden 34, Herford" with 4 other German Masonic Lodges.

British Forces were reduced again as part of the 2010 UK's "Strategic Defence and Security Review," (SDR), the Lodge now recruits its members from the expatriates living in and around the area, this also include German and other nationals interested in practicing Freemasonry in the English language following the English constitution provided by the United Grand Lodge of England. However, many of the members today who have decided to remain in Germany used to serve in the successors of above mention units and celebrate the 1 August as Minden Day.

See also
 John Manners, Marquess of Granby
 Granville Elliott
 Great Britain in the Seven Years War

Notes

References

Bibliography

External links

 Battle of Minden at www.britishbattles.com
 Battle of Minden at amtage.de 
 A Map of That Part of Westphalia, in Which the French Army Where Defeated Aug. 1, 1759
 Battle of Minden documented in English maps 
 Minden mystery roses
 Official British Army website - news of the British Army's traditional commemoration of Minden Day 2012
 The Royal Scottish Borderers (1 SCOTS) Minden Day parade, Berwick Upon Tweed 2008. Royal Scottish Borderers are the descendant of Kings Own Scottish Borderers and uphold their traditions. Note the red rose in each Tam O'Shanter alongside the black hackle
 Die Schlacht bei Minden. Eine Karte aus dem Siebenjährigen Krieg von William Roy (in German)

1759 in Prussia
Battles involving France
Battles involving Great Britain
Battles involving Hesse-Kassel
Battles involving Prussia
Battles involving Saxony
Battles of the Seven Years' War
Battle of Minden
Battles in North Rhine-Westphalia
Battle